Iag Bari - The Gypsy Horns From The Mountains Beyond is the third album released by Romanian twelve-piece Roma brass band Fanfare Ciocărlia. The album was recorded May 2001 at Studio Electrocord in Bucharest, Romania, and mixed at UFO-Sound Studios in Berlin, Germany. Producers are Henry Ernst and Helmut Neumann. The album was released 2001 by Piranha Musik.

Track listing 
 Doina (Westside Blues) — 2:27
 Wild Silence — 0:37
 Iag Bari (The Big Longing) — 4:34
 Dusty Road — 2:24
 Lume, lume (World, World) — 2:53
 Jocul Boldenilor — 2:19
 Hora din Petrosnitza — 1:57
 Banatzeana — 1:24
 Tu Romnie (Don't Go Away) — 3:34
 Moliendo Café — 2:27
 Balada lui Ioan — 3:27
 Besh o Drom (Keep On Walking) — 5:56
 Hora Andalusia — 3:40
 Hurichestra — 3:29
 So te kerau? (What Shall I Do?) — 3:51
 Hora lautareasca — 2:41
 Ginduri de om batrin (Old Man Thinking) — 4:14
 Bubamara — 1:58
 Manea du voca — (video) 2:41

References

2001 albums
Fanfare Ciocărlia albums